The Delta State University of Science and Technology is a Public University in Ozoro, Delta State.

The university is set to offer undergraduate and postgraduate courses covering seven faculties: Agriculture, Science, Earth Science, Engineering, Environmental science, Information technology and Management technology.

History 
The Delta State University of Science and Technology,  Ozoro was first established as a college of Agriculture which was turned into a Polytechnic on January 1, 2002, by law during the administration of James Ibori.

In January 2021, Governor Ifeanyi A Okowa of Delta State announced plans to convert Delta State Polytechnic, Ozoro and two other schools into a full-fledged University, the bills had its first reading during plenary at the Delta State House of Assembly on the 28th day of January 2021.

In February 2021, the bill were passed into law after going through the house committee on Education.

While signing the bill which was passed by the State House Assembly, Governor Ifeanyi A Okowa said, "As the students of our technical education start to progress from the technical colleges to the polytechnics, they also have a chance of going further to the University of Science and Technology."

Faculties/Departments 
Faculties

Faculty of Agriculture
Faculty of Science
Faculty of Earth Science
Faculty of Engineering
Faculty of Environmental science
Faculty of Information Technology
Faculty of Management Science

Departments

 Agricultural Extension and Rural Development
 Animal Production and Health Services
 Fisheries Technology
 Agricultural Economics and Farm Management
 Agricultural Business
 Crop Science and Technology
 Biological Sciences
 Chemical Sciences
 Physics
 Mathematics and Statistics
 Forensic Science
 Science Laboratory Technology
 Geology
 Marine Science
 Environmental Management and Toxicology
 Petroleum Chemistry
 Petroleum Engineering
 Marine Engineering
 Gas and Oil Engineering
 Mechanical Engineering
 Civil Engineering
 Water Resources Engineering
 Agricultural Engineering
 Electrical Engineering
 Food Science and Technology
 Aerospace Engineering
 Material and Metallurgical Engineering
 Computer Science
 Cyber Security
 Software Engineering
 Information System and Technology
 Architecture
 Estate Management
 Quantity Surveying
 Surveying and Geoinformatics
 Building Technology
 Environmental Management
 Urban and Regional Planning
 Fine and Applied Arts
Industrial Design
 Accounting and Finance 
 Marketing
 Business Administration
 Entrepreneurship
 Transport Management
 Office Technology Management
 Media and Communication Management

Notable alumni
Tim Owhefere, Nigerian politician

See also
 List of universities in Nigeria
 List of Tertiary Institutions in Delta State
 Delta State University, Abraka
 University of Delta, Agbor
 University of Benin (Nigeria)
 Dennis Osadebe University, Asaba

References 

Public universities in Nigeria
Education in Delta State